Vidhan Bhavan is an Indian term for a house of State Legislative Assembly and may refer to:

 Vidhan Bhavan, Lucknow, the seat of the legislature of Uttar Pradesh
 Vidhan Bhavan, Nagpur, a building of the Maharashtra Legislature
 Vidhan Bhavan metro station, a planned station in Mumbai